Lead climbing competitions at the 2019 IFSC Climbing World Cup were held at six locations, from 4 July to 27 October 2019. The top three in each competition received medals, and at the end of the season, the overall winners were awarded trophies. The overall winners were determined based upon points, which athletes were awarded for finishing in the top 30 of each individual event. Adam Ondra won the men's seasonal title, Chaehyun Seo won the women's seasonal title, and Japan won the national team title.

Winners overview

Overall ranking 
The overall ranking is determined based upon points, which athletes are awarded for finishing in the top 30 of each individual event. There are six competitions in the season, but only the best five attempts are counted. The national ranking is the sum of the points of that country's three best male and female athletes. Results displayed in parentheses are not counted.

Men 
The results of the ten most successful athletes of the Lead World Cup 2019:

Women 
The results of the ten most successful athletes of the Lead World Cup 2019:

National Teams 
The results of the ten most successful countries of the Lead World Cup 2019:

Country names as used by the IFSC

Villars, Switzerland (July, 4–6) 
97 men and 86 women attended the event.

In men's, Switzerland's Sascha Lehmann topped the final route and claimed victory in front of his home crowd. China's YuFei Pan and Germany's Alexander Megos, also topped the final route, placed second and third respectively due to count-backs to the semi-final. Japan's Tomoa Narasaki, who was leading in the semi-final round, stepped on the rope and slipped, taking sixth place.

In women's, Slovenia's Janja Garnbret was the winner of the event. In the semi-final round, Garnbret claimed the only top of the route despite dropping her chalk bag. South Korea's 15-year-old Chaehyun Seo took second place in her first adult World Cup competition. Japan's Ai Mori, also 15 years old, took third place. South Korea's Jain Kim was forced to withdraw from the competition after suffering a finger injury in the qualification round.

Chamonix, France (July, 11–13) 
111 men and 103 women attended the event.

In men's, Czech Republic's Adam Ondra topped both qualification routes, ascended higher than anyone else on the semi-final and final routes, and thus securing the win. Germany's Alexander Megos took second place while Austria's Jakob Schubert took third. Ondra would skip the Briançon's event to prepare for the World Championships.

In women's, the final's bottleneck led to count-backs to semi-final results. Eventually, South Korea's Chaehyun Seo took the win. China's YueTong Zhang placed second and Austria's Jessica Pilz third. The winner of last week's event, Slovenia's Janja Garnbret slipped on the semi-final route, placing 9th, barely missing the final. This was the first time Garnbret ever missed a Lead World Cup final.

Briançon, France (July, 19–20) 
88 men and 79 women attended the event.

In men's, the Japanese team swept the podium. Hidemasa Nishida claimed the win, Hiroto Shimizu placed second, and Shuta Tanaka placed third. None of them had been on a World Cup podium before.

In women's, last week's winner, South Korea's Chaehyun Seo took the win again. Seo and Slovenian superstar Janja Garnbret topped the final route, but Seo pushed Garnbret to second place by count-back to the semi-final results. Japan's Natsuki Tanii placed third.

Kranj, Slovenia (September, 28–29) 
72 men and 53 women attended the event.

In men's, Czech Republic's Adam Ondra, having just won the Lead World Championships in August, claimed the only top of the final route, securing the win. Japan's Kai Harada took second place and Spain's Alberto Ginés López took third.

In women's, South Korea's Chaehyun Seo continued her winning streak, claiming her third gold medal. Austria's Jessica Pilz took second place and Slovenia's Lucka Rakovec took third. Japan's Ai Mori topped both qualification routes and led the field in the semi-fnal round, but struggled in the final and had to settle for 5th place. Slovenia's Janja Garnbret, having just won the Lead World Championships in August, struggled in the semi-final and placed 13th. This event marked the return of South Korea's Jain Kim to the World Cup circuit after her finger injury. Kim placed 9th, barely missing a spot in the final.

Xiamen, China (October, 18–20) 
55 men and 51 women attended the event.

In men's, Czech Republic's Adam Ondra claimed his third win, undefeated in the lead events he participated in. Japan's Taisei Homma and Tomoa Narasaki placed second third respectively. Japan's Kai Harada led the semi-final round but fell short in the final round, placing 4th.

In women's, South Korea's Chaehyun Seo topped all the routes of the event, securing her fourth consecutive win and the overall Lead World Champion title. Japan's Akiyo Noguchi claimed second place, while South Korea's Jain Kim claimed third. Slovenia's Janja Garnbret, along with Seo, topped qualification and semi-final routes, but fell trying to jump to the top on the final route, thus finishing in 4th place.

Inzai, Japan (October, 26–27) 
54 men and 52 women attended the event.

In men's, Japan's Hiroto Shimizu claimed the gold medal. Spain's Alberto Ginés López placed second and Italy's Stefano Ghisolfi third. Czech Republic's Adam Ondra, absent from the competition, claimed the lead season's champion title.

In women's, South Korea's veteran Jain Kim topped the final route and secured the win, claiming her 30th gold medal in the World Cup competitions. Slovenia's Janja Garnbret was leading the competition coming into the final, but could not match Kim's top in the final round, thus placed second. South Korea's Chaehyun Seo, the lead season's overall champion, finished in third place.

References 

IFSC Climbing World Cup
2019 in sport climbing